Dispepsi is the eighth album by the American experimental plunderphonics band Negativland. It was released on July 29, 1997, by Seeland Records, Negativland's record label. It is structured as a statement against the major soft drink companies and contains many samples of advertisements from the industry. Particularly, the collage album focuses on Pepsi adverts.

History
The album was an attack on the highly competitive soft drink companies Coca-Cola and Pepsi. The title is a variation of dyspepsia, which is synonymous with indigestion. The word "Dispepsi" deliberately does not appear anywhere on the album artwork, but a telephone number was set up to provide the proper title. It is scrambled into anagrams including "Pedissip" and "Ideppiss", as the band originally believed they would be sued for trademark infringement if the actual title was shown. Once Pepsi lawyers indicated that they had no intention of suing Negativland, they began referring to it by its actual title. However, on the front artwork, the actual album title could be un-scrambled by reading the red letters in order of their decreasing size, starting with the largest, D, and ending with the smallest, I.

Notes on samples include:
"All of the cola commercials that were appropriated, transformed, and reused in this recording attempted to assault us in our homes without permission. Other sources reused include: talk radio, MOMMIE DEAREST, tabloid TV, Pepsi and Shirlie, documentary TV, Bryan Ferry, the news, Ice-T, public service announcements, Asha Bhosle, MC Lyte, The Clio Awards, traditional Burmese music, the O. J. Simpson murder case, motivational marketing tapes by advertising executives."
A music video for "The Greatest Taste Around" incorporates clips of Pepsi ads synchronized with the song.

Track listing
"The Smile You Can't Hide" (1:34)
"Drink It Up" (3:46)
"Why Is This Commercial?" (2:18)
"Happy Hero" (5:03)
"A Most Successful Formula" (3:30)
"The Greatest Taste Around" (2:14)
"Hyper Real" (0:54)
"All She Called About" (3:23)
"I Believe It's L" - Ft. Steve Fisk (6:21)
"Humanitarian Effort" (0:32)
"Voice Inside My Head" (3:46)
"Aluminum or Glass: The Memo" (3:46)
"Bite Back" (5:31)

Credits 

 Made, played, recorded and mixed by: Negativland
 Keyboards and drum boxing on "I Believe It's L": Steve Fisk
 Dyspeptic designing: Shawn Wolfe
 Tuneless found warbling: Catherine Carter
 Authoritative voice and number crunching: Peter Conheim
 Video jiggling: Harold Boihem
 Commercial contributions: Arjan Schutte and John Skelton
 Image looting: Craig Baldwin
 Drum butchering: Pat Maley
 Digital master assembling: Matt Spiro and James LeBrecht
 Free legal advising from our team of lawyer-operated salad shooters: Keith Aoki, James Boyle, Kohel Haver, Alan Korn, Jeffery Selman and Peter Shaver
 Unlimited access to their vast archives: One World Advertising

References

Negativland albums
1997 albums
PepsiCo
Cola
Seeland Records albums
Sound collage albums
Plunderphonics albums